Turahbuglossus is an extinct genus of prehistoric bony fish that lived from the early to middle Eocene.

See also

 Prehistoric fish
 List of prehistoric bony fish

References

Eocene fish